"Pac-Man Fever" is a hit single by Buckner & Garcia. Capitalizing on the video game craze of the early 1980s, the song, about the classic video game Pac-Man, peaked at number 9 on the Billboard Hot 100 in the United States in March 1982.

That same month, it was certified Gold by the RIAA for over one million units shipped to retailers; the single sold 1.2 million copies by the end of 1982, and 2.5 million copies in total as of 2008. VH1 ranked it at number 98 on their list of 100 Greatest One Hit Wonders of the 80s.

A follow-up release in May 1982, "Do the Donkey Kong", just missed the Billboard chart, ranking number 103.

This song was featured in the South Park episode "Splatty Tomato" as well as the Family Guy episode "The D in Apartment 23", both aired in 2017.

Background

Buckner and Garcia were in the Atlanta area in 1981, recording TV jingles and other low-profile studio work. They were eating at a restaurant down the road in Marietta, and they saw other diners swarming around a brand new Pac-Man machine. The duo had never heard of the game before, but they waited their turn and played it too, and ended up playing for two hours straight. After that, they decided to write a novelty song about the game. Their manager shopped the song at radio stations nationwide, but no one wanted to play it. However, when they shopped it locally, WSTR (FM) in Atlanta decided to play it for fun on their show one morning. The station was bombarded with calls from listeners who begged to hear it again and again. This got the attention of CBS Records as well as other stations across the country, and the single hit #9 on the US Billboard charts in 1982.

Chart performance

Weekly charts

Year-end charts

Re-recorded album
In 1998, the duo was asked to record an unplugged version of "Pac-Man Fever" exclusively for the syndicated radio show Retro Rewind. In 1999, a re-recorded version of the album was released independently by Buckner and Garcia, which was released commercially through K-Tel in 2002. However, Buckner and Garcia could not obtain the original master recordings from Sony Music Entertainment, so the duo was forced to record new performances of the songs and recreate a lot of the sound effects either digitally or musically.

In honor of the release of the 2015 film Pixels, Jerry Buckner, and Danny Jones with Jace Hall, took the vocals from Gary Garcia's master recording, and created a new version called "Pac-Man Fever Eat Em' Up".

Related song
"Weird Al" Yankovic recorded a similar song in late 1981 called "Pac-Man", during the height of the game's popularity. It is based on The Beatles' song "Taxman."  The song was released on the compilations Dr. Demento's Basement Tapes No. 4 and Squeeze Box: The Complete Works of "Weird Al" Yankovic.

References

External links
 Lyrics of this song
 

1982 singles
Novelty songs
Pac-Man
Music based on video games
Columbia Records singles
1981 songs
American pop rock songs
CBS Records singles
Songs about video games